The BBC2 Horror Double Bills were seasons of classic horror movies broadcast annually in the UK on BBC2 television between 1975 and 1983, with a revival in 1993. They provided rare opportunities (in a pre-VHS or DVD era) to see some of these films.

Format and content
Each Saturday night during the summer (usually July and August), two horror, science-fiction or fantasy movies would be shown, the majority of which were from Universal and Hammer studios, though lesser known movies were also featured. The first season was broadcast in 1975, under the title "Midnight Movie Fantastic", though the season title would vary throughout the years ("Horror Double Bill," "Monster Double Bill," "Dracula, Frankenstein & Friends"). The third season in 1977 ("Dracula, Frankenstein & Friends"), featured the best known Universal monster titles (paired with each other or a Hammer/AIP title), whilst the final original season in 1981 consisted of titles from Val Lewton's horror cycle made for RKO paired with more obscure modern titles.

After seven years, there was no season in 1982. A final series of Double Bills was broadcast during the summer of 1983, although this season was entirely made up of the classic Universal horrors from the 1930s and 1940s, all of which had been shown before, predominantly in the 1977 season "Dracula, Frankenstein & Friends."

The 1990s

After 1983, the BBC rested the format. However the Double Bills returned in 1993 following the success of an all-night Halloween horror marathon on BBC2 a year earlier.  The marathon was introduced and linked by Dr. Walpurgis, played by Guy Henry and created by Kim Newman. The other event of that evening was the broadcast of Ghostwatch on BBC1 starring Michael Parkinson, Mike Smith & Sarah Greene. During this evening, it was intended that Dr. Walpurgis would have the privilege of introducing for the first time on British TV the uncut version of Curse of the Werewolf (Hammer 1960), which the doctor described as having "extra stalk and slash scenes." However, problems led to the showing of the usual cut version of the film. The uncut version aired a few months later.

Dr. Terror's Vault of Horror was broadcast on Fridays on BBC1 between September and December 1993 and featured Guy Henry's character, though he was renamed Dr. Terror. The Double Bills only ran one year, although Dr. Terror would return to introduce individual horrors in 1994 and 1996.

List of films broadcast in the Double Bill

1975 Midnight Movie Fantastic

1976 Masters of Terror

1977 Dracula, Frankenstein and Friends

1978 Monster Double Bill

1979 Masters of Terror

1980 Horror Double Bill

1981 Horror Double Bill

1983 Horror Double Bill

1992 BBC2 All-Night Halloween Marathon

The Vault of Horror
A festival of terror, hosted by Dr Walpurgis, for Hallowe'en.
Producers Mark Deitch, Nick Freand Jones

Dr. Terror Seasons 1993 - 1995

1993 Dr. Terror's Vault of Horror

Dr. Terror Season 1994

Dr. Terror Season 1996

References

BBC Television shows